Peter Richard Charles Smith, Baron Smith of Leigh (24 July 1945 – 2 August 2021) was a British Labour local politician and life peer.

Career
Peter Smith was educated at Bolton School before going up to LSE where he graduated in economics. Whilst serving as Leader of Wigan Council and undertaking his duties at the House of Lords, he also completed an MSc in Urban Studies at the University of Salford. 

Smith had been a member of Wigan Metropolitan Borough Council since 1978 and was Chairman of its Finance Committee from 1982 to 1991; from 1991 to 2018, he served as Leader of the Council.
Created a Life Peer on 5 August 1999 as Baron Smith of Leigh, of Wigan in the County of Greater Manchester, since 2005 he has been Treasurer of the Rugby League Group and, since 2006, Vice-Chair of the Parliamentary Labour Party's Departmental Committee for Office of the Deputy Prime Minister. He was the Chairman of Local Government Leadership, a body seeking to develop leadership skills in local government.

He was Chair of The Association of Greater Manchester Authorities (AGMA) from 2000 to 2021. He chaired the successor Greater Manchester Combined Authority from its creation in 2011 until the appointment of the interim Mayor in 2015.

Personal life

Lord Smith was married with one daughter, the artist Anna F C Smith. 

On 3 August 2021, it was announced that he had died at the age of 76.

See also
 Metropolitan Borough of Wigan

References

External links
 Lord Smith of Leigh
 Burke's Peerage & Baronetage

1945 births
2021 deaths
Alumni of the London School of Economics
Labour Party (UK) life peers
People educated at Bolton School
People from Wigan
People from Lowton
Life peers created by Elizabeth II
Members of the Greater Manchester Combined Authority